Shishk (also Romanized as Shīshk; also known as Sheshk and Sheshtak) is a village in Garmab Rural District, Chahardangeh District, Sari County, Mazandaran Province, Iran. In the 2006 census, its population was 173, with 46 families.

References 

Populated places in Sari County